Human Nature is a 2001 comedy drama film written by Charlie Kaufman and directed by Michel Gondry in his directorial debut. The film stars Tim Robbins, Patricia Arquette, Rhys Ifans, Miranda Otto, and Rosie Perez. It tells the story of three people—a writer with hypertrichosis, a man who was raised as an ape away from civilization, and a psychologist who attempts to socialize the ape-man into a civilized member of society and tame his more animal instincts.

It was screened out of competition at the 54th Cannes International Film Festival.

Plot 
In a flashback, Puff, a man who was raised as an ape in the wilderness, makes a testimony to Congress, while writer Lila Jute tells her story to the police. Meanwhile, dead psychologist Nathan Bronfman addresses an unseen audience in the afterlife.

Lila is a woman with a rare hormonal imbalance which causes thick hair to grow all over her body. During her 20s after a brief freak show gig, Lila decides to leave society and live within nature where she feels free to exist comfortably in her natural state. She writes a successful book about her naked, savage, happy, and free life in the woods embracing nature. Then, at age 30, strong sexual desire causes her to return to civilization and have her hair removed in order to find a partner.

The partner she finds is Dr. Nathan Bronfman, a psychologist researching the possibility of teaching table manners to mice. Lila and Nathan go hiking in the woods one day. Lila sights a naked man acting like an ape in the woods who has lived as a wild animal his entire life. Lila discards her clothes and chases him until he's cornered on a tree branch. The man falls off the branch, knocked unconscious. Brought to Nathan's lab, the man is named Puff, after Nathan's French research assistant Gabrielle's childhood dog. We discover later from her phone call to an unknown person that she is actually an American with a fake French accent. First with the help of Gabrielle and later with Lila's help, Nathan performs conditioned reinforcement training on Puff, inculcating him with a veneer of fine manners and high culture, in spite of which Puff still has difficulty controlling sexual urges.

To demonstrate his success, Nathan takes Puff on tour. Puff secretly drinks heavily and patronizes prostitutes. Meanwhile, Nathan and Lila's relationship deteriorates and he is seduced into an affair by a scheming Gabrielle. Eventually Lila decides to take Puff back into the forest to undo his manners training and return him to his natural state.

Lila and Puff live naked in the woods together until found by a threatening Nathan, who is killed by Puff. Lila turns herself in as the murderer and asks Puff to testify on the waywardness of humanity before he returns to his home in the forest after a brief encounter with his biological mother.

After the reporters and spectators leave, Puff comes back out of the forest and gets into a car with Gabrielle (still with a French accent). They drive off to the city to eat, while Puff looks back thoughtfully at the forest. The ending strongly suggests some unexplained collusion between the two, throwing much of the interpretation of what went on before into question.

At the end of the film, there is a philosophical passage read while the credits appear. It is an excerpt of William of Ockham from Opera Theologica in which Ockham explains his theory of intuitive cognition:

Cast 
 Patricia Arquette as Lila Jute, a writer with hypertrichosis.
 Hilary Duff as Young Lila Jute
 Tim Robbins as Nathan Bronfman, a psychologist.
 Chase MacKenzie Bebak as Young Nathan Bronfman
 Rhys Ifans as Puff, a man found in the forest acting like an ape.
 Bobby Pyle as Young Puff
 Rosie Perez as Louise, a friend of Lila who specializes in electrology.
 Miranda Otto as Gabrielle, Nathan's assistant who speaks in a French accent.
 Peter Dinklage as Frank
 Mary Kay Place as Mrs. Bronfman
 Robert Forster as Mr. Bronfman
 Toby Huss as Puff's Father, a man who acted like an ape which carried to his son after they relocated to the woods.
 Ken Magee, Sy Richardson, and David Warshofsky as the police detectives
 Bobby Harwell and Daryl Anderson as the congressmen
 Miguel Sandoval as Wendell, a therapist.
 Nancy Lenehan as Puff's Mother

Production 
Steven Soderbergh was first interested in directing Charlie Kaufman's script back in late 1996, when Kaufman was still trying to get Being John Malkovich produced. Soderbergh's considerations for casting were for David Hyde Pierce in the role of Nathan Bronfman, Chris Kattan in the role of Puff (likely due to his character Mr. Peepers on Saturday Night Live at the time), and Marisa Tomei in the role of Lila Jute. He was about to go into pre-production when he was offered Out of Sight and after much deliberation he left the project.

Reception

Box office
Human Nature grossed $705,308 in the United States and Canada, and $869,352 in other territories for a worldwide total of 1.6 million, against a production budget of $8.6 million.

Critical response 
On review aggregator Rotten Tomatoes, the film holds a score of 48% based on 95 reviews, and an average rating of 5.8/10. The website's consensus reads, "As quirky as Being John Malkovich but not as funny, Human Nature feels too forced and unengaging." On Metacritic, it has an average score of 56 out of 100 based on 30 critics, indicating "mixed or average reviews".

Roger Ebert awarded the film three-stars out of four, lauding the film's "screwball charm" and commenting that director Gondry stages the film with a "level of mad whimsy" that feels "just about right". 

In a 2009 review as part of his "Year of Flops" series, critic Nathan Rabin argued that the screenplay, as well as the collaboration between Kaufman and Gondry (the first before Eternal Sunshine of the Spotless Mind), had all the ingredients for a sharp social satire. Rabin wrote that like Kaufman’s scripts for films like Eternal Sunshine, Being John Malkovich, and Adaptation, Human Nature "uses a fantastical conceit to explore the fresh hell of existence and our desperate attempts to deny who we are and what we want." However, Rabin stated that Kaufman’s other works"…are grounded in visceral human emotions and feel gloriously, painfully alive, [whereas] Human Nature feels strangely hermetic. Ifans, Robbins, and Arquette breathe incredible melancholy, pain, and confusion into their characters, but they cannot make them human. That is perhaps the tragedy of Human Nature: Despite its title and abundance of brilliant ideas and clever lines, it feels strangely abstract and theoretical. Rewatching Human Nature eight years on, the film’s bone-deep sadness resonates more strongly than its cerebral comedy of manners. It’s a profoundly flawed and strangely affecting film about what Arquette refers to as the 'waywardness of humankind' and the sublime agony of being human."

See also 
 State of nature
 Deep ecology
 Neo-tribalism
 Jean-Jacques Rousseau
 Ishmael
 No Exit

References

External links 
 
 

2001 films
2000s fantasy comedy-drama films
American satirical films
Films directed by Michel Gondry
American fantasy comedy-drama films
2001 directorial debut films
2000s English-language films
Films with screenplays by Charlie Kaufman
StudioCanal films
2001 independent films
Films scored by Graeme Revell
Mad scientist films
Fictional feral children
Films about sexual repression
English-language French films
2000s satirical films
French fantasy comedy-drama films
French satirical films
2000s American films
2000s French films